Linderbach may refer to:

Linderbach (Gramme), a river of Thuringia, Germany, tributary of the Gramme
Linderbach, Erfurt, a district of the city Erfurt, Thuringia, Germany